The Museum of El Greco (aka El Greco Museum or Domenikos Theotokopoulos Museum) is located on the edge of the village of Fodele in Crete, west of the city of Heraklion. It celebrates the mannerist painter El Greco (Domenikos Theotokopoulos, 1541–1614), who grew up in the village.

Overview
The museum is located around 1 km from the centre of Fodele opposite a chapel and contains copies of works by and documents associated with El Greco. The original building was in a ruinous state but was restored from 1982 onwards through a grant by the Greek Ministry of Culture. The museum opened to the public in 1998. The village of Fodele is claimed as the birthplace of El Greco, but this is disputed. The museum claims to be where El Greco was born.

The Historical Museum of Crete in Heraklion not far away includes two original works by El Greco, the only original works by the artist in Crete.

Gallery

See also
 El Greco Museum, Toledo, Spain (where El Greco worked later)

References

External links

 Museum website

Museum of El Greco
Art museums established in 1998
Art museums and galleries in Greece
Biographical museums in Greece
Museums in Crete
Buildings and structures in Heraklion (regional unit)
El Greco
Greco, El